The 50th Grand Bell Awards, also known as Daejong Film Awards, are determined and presented annually by The Motion Pictures Association of Korea for excellence in film in South Korea. The Grand Bell Awards were first presented in 1962 and have gained prestige as the Korean equivalent of the American Academy Awards.

50th ceremony
The 50th Grand Bell Awards ceremony was held at the KBS Hall in Yeouido, Seoul on November 1, 2013 and hosted by Shin Hyun-joon and Ha Ji-won.

Nominations and winners
(Winners denoted in bold)

References

External links 
 

Grand Bell Awards
Grand Bell Awards
Grand Bell Awards